The Bounty Killer is a 1965 American Technicolor and Techniscope Western film directed by Spencer Gordon Bennet, written by Ruth Alexander and Leo Gordon, and starring Dan Duryea and Rod Cameron. The supporting cast features Audrey Dalton, Richard Arlen, Buster Crabbe, Fuzzy Knight, Johnny Mack Brown and Tom Kennedy. Broncho Billy Anderson, the cinema's first Western film star, makes his final  appearance in the film. The film was released on July 31, 1965, by Embassy Pictures.

Plot
Vermont native Willie Duggan comes west by stage coach. When he arrives in Silver Creek, broke but proud, he is befriended by the “captain”. Then he is brutally beaten for talking to dance hall hostess Carole Ridgeway. The thrashing, however, is terminated by Johnny Liam, who shoots and kills Duggan's assailant. Duggan finds work with a transport company, delivering the miners' payroll. When Duggan and his assistant Luther are ambushed, Duggan kills the robber.

After discovering that rewards are given for such work, Duggan and Luther become bounty hunters. Although they capture outlaw Mike Clayman, his henchmen follow the pair, killing Luther and wounding Duggan. The unconscious victim is found by rancher Ridgeway, whose daughter Carole restores the gunman to health. Despite his love for Carole, Duggan resolves to avenge his partner's death, cuts a double-barrel shotgun down to pistol length, and launches a one-man campaign to exterminate outlaws, Johnny Liam's younger brother among them. and later, Liam himself.

In his zeal, Duggan finally kills an innocent man, becoming a criminal in his own right. While eloping with Carole, Duggan himself is slain from ambush by a bounty hunter.

Cast
 
 Dan Duryea as Willie Duggan
 Rod Cameron as Johnny Liam
 Audrey Dalton as Carole Ridgeway
 Richard Arlen as Matthew Ridgeway
 Buster Crabbe as Mike Clayman
 Fuzzy Knight as Captain Luther
 Johnny Mack Brown as Sheriff Green
 Peter Duryea as Youth 
 Eddie Quillan as Pianist
 Grady Sutton as Minister
 Emory Parnell as Sam 
 Norman Willis as Hank Willis
 Boyd Morgan as Big Jim Seddon 
 Bob Steele as Red
 Dan White as Marshal Davis 
 John Reach as Jeb
 Duane Ament as Ben Liam
 Michael Hinn as Mr. Weaver
 Dolores Domasin as Cantina Waitress
 Edmund Cobb as Townsman
 Ronn Delanor as Joe 
 Dudley Ross as Indian
 I. Stanford Jolley as Sheriff Jones
 Frank Lackteen as Bartender in Cantina / Man in Audience
 Tom Kennedy as Joe 
 Broncho Billy Anderson as The Man in the Cantina

References

External links 
 
 
 
 

1965 films
1960s English-language films
American Western (genre) films
1965 Western (genre) films
Films directed by Spencer Gordon Bennet
Embassy Pictures films
Films scored by Ronald Stein
1960s American films